Bhatta Kallata also referred as Kallata was a notable 9th-century Kashmiri Shaivite thinker who may have written the Spanda-vritti, and Spanda-karika.

He was a pupil of Vasugupta, another possible author of the Spanda-karika. According to Rajatarangini (The River of Kings) written in 12th-century CE by Kalhana, he lived during the reign of Avanti Varman (855-883 CE).

Bibliography
 Yoga Spandakarika: The Sacred Texts at the Origins of Tantra, by Daniel Odier. Inner Traditions, 2005 .

References

External links
 

Kashmiri writers
Kashmir Shaivism
Year of birth missing
Year of death missing
Indian Shaivites
9th-century philosophers
9th-century Indian people
Hindu philosophers and theologians
Kashmiri Brahmins
Kashmiri people